Husárová is a Slovak surname. Notable people with the surname include:

Janette Husárová (born 1974), retired Slovak professional tennis player
Veronika Husárová (born 1987), Slovak beauty queen 

Slovak-language surnames